Retire Common is a Site of Special Scientific Interest, noted for its biological characteristics, in mid Cornwall, England, UK.

Geography
The springs in the area of the Common form the headwaters of a tributary of the River Camel.

References

Sites of Special Scientific Interest in Cornwall
Sites of Special Scientific Interest notified in 1951